Robert Roger Amparan (born May 21, 1989), known professionally as Hypno Carlito, is an American rapper from Chicago, Illinois. He was the first artist signed to Lil Durk & his OTF Entertainment. He was featured on Lil Durks Album “Remember My Name” with the single “Ghetto”. He released his first album, Never Say Never, in July 2016 with Features from French Montana, Lil Durk, Redcafe, & more. Hypno Carlito appeared back on the scene with “Good Karma” The Album in 2020, with features from Lil Durk, Mozzy, YBN Almighty Jay, Twista, Boro Boro & More. In 2015 Hypno Carlito Wrote “Pray For My City” Performed By Nick Cannon Which Featured In Spike Lee’s Motion Picture “Chiraq”, In 2021 He Executive Produced Nick Cannon’s “The Miseducation Of The Negro You Love To Hate”. Robert Amparan is the Writer, Director, & Producer behind Motion Picture “Primary Position” which featured Omar Gooding, Antwon Tanner, Jamal Woolard, Kris. D Lofton, Barton Fitzpatrick, & more.  He is best known for his mixtape Never Say Never Again released in 2017, and for his affiliation with the Only the Family collective.

Early life
Robert Roger Amparan was born on May 21, 1989, in Chicago, Illinois.

Career
Hypno Carlito released his first single, Forever, featuring Lil Varney with accompanying music video in 2015. Later in 2015, Carlito was signed to fellow Chicago rapper Lil Durk's record label, Only the Family. In 2017, he was featured on Lil Durk and YFN Lucci's single, Watch Out. Later in 2017, he received local attention for his critically acclaimed mixtape Sorry 4 The Hate. In early 2019, he again received local attention for his mixtape Never Cared featuring Lil Durk. Following the release of Never Cared, Hypno Carlito released Good Karma in December 2019.

Discography

Studio albums

Singles

References

https://www.imdb.com/name/nm13559608/

External links
Hypno Carlito Official Instagram

1980 births
Living people
Rappers from Chicago